Quentin Bigot (born 1 December 1992) is a French athlete specialising in the hammer throw. He won the silver medal at the 2019 World Championships.

In July 2014 he was suspended for 4 years (2 on probation) for doping.

On 22 May 2021, he did his personal best with 78.99	m at Polideportivo Municipal, Andújar (ESP), improved on 8 June 2021 with 79.70 m at Paavo Nurmi Games in Turku.

Competition record

References

External links

1992 births
Living people
French male hammer throwers
Athletes (track and field) at the 2012 Summer Olympics
Olympic athletes of France
People from Hayange
Doping cases in athletics
French sportspeople in doping cases
Sportspeople from Moselle (department)
World Athletics Championships athletes for France
World Athletics Championships medalists
French Athletics Championships winners
Athletes (track and field) at the 2013 Mediterranean Games
Mediterranean Games competitors for France
Athletes (track and field) at the 2020 Summer Olympics
20th-century French people
21st-century French people